Badile may refer to:

Antonio Badile (c. 1518–1560), an Italian painter from Verona
Piz Badile, a mountain in Switzerland/Italy